George Kitt (1853 – 2 February 1940) was a New Zealand cricketer. He played one first-class match for Otago in 1886 and 1887.

See also
 List of Otago representative cricketers

References

External links
 

1853 births
1940 deaths
New Zealand cricketers
Otago cricketers
People from Shoreditch